"Brasileirinho" is a 1947 Brazilian choro composed by Valdir Azevedo.

Brasileirinho may also refer to:

 Brasileirinho (film), 2005 documentary directed by Mika Kaurismäki
 15453 Brasileirinhos, minor planet